Bernard Cabane (born 12 October 1945) is a French mountaineer, scientist (physicist and chemist), director emeritus of the French National Center for Scientific Research (CNRS) in ESPCI ParisTech where he worked with Nobel Laureate Pierre Gilles De Gennes and corresponding member of the French Academy of Sciences.  He was awarded the Silver Medal of the French National Center for Scientific Research. Expert in colloidal and surface science, wine tannins, polymers and surfactants, and fluid dynamics. In mountaineering, he is known for making the 7th ascent of Mt Salcantay in Peru.

References

External links
List of publications, articles, and research on Google Scholar

20th-century French scientists
Members of the French Academy of Sciences
Academic staff of ESPCI Paris
Living people
1945 births
French mountain climbers
Research directors of the French National Centre for Scientific Research